Pierre Viot (9 April 1925 – 6 August 2020) was a French executive. He served as a senior advisor on the French Court of Audit.

Biography
Former student of the École nationale d'administration (Jean-Giraudoux promotion, 1950-1952). Viot headed the Centre national du cinéma et de l'image animée from 1973 to 1984. He was elected as President of the Cannes Film Festival in 1984, replacing Robert Favre Le Bret until 2000. He presided over the Opéra Bastille from 1985 to 1990, and the Paris Opera from 1985 to 1987.

Viot died on 6 August 2020 at the age of 95.

Distinctions
Commander of the Legion of Honour (1999)
Grand Cross of the Ordre national du Mérite (2013)

References

French chief executives
1925 births
2020 deaths
People from Bordeaux